Arthur Woollgar Verrall (5 February 1851, Brighton – 18 June 1912, Cambridge) was a British classics scholar associated with Trinity College, Cambridge, and the first occupant of the King Edward VII Chair of English. He was noted for his translations and for his challenging, unorthodox interpretations of the Greek dramatists, such as his commentary on Agamemnon; his detractors found his readings contorted and too ingenious, too often overlooking obvious explanations in favour of the convoluted, and his published work is nowadays not highly regarded. After his death, admirers M. A. Bayfield and J. D. Duff edited  Verrall's Collected Literary Essays. Classical and Modern and Collected Essays in Greek and Latin Scholarship 1914. Among his publications, Euripides the Rationalist was highly influential. He was a member of the Cambridge Apostles, a secret society, from 1871.

Life
Arthur Woollgar Verrall was the son of a solicitor. He was educated at Twyford School, Wellington College, and Trinity College, Cambridge, where he graduated BA as 2nd Classic in 1872. Elected a fellow of Trinity in 1874, he was a College Lecturer from 1877 to 1911. In February 1911, he was appointed to fill the new King Edward VII professorship of literature at Cambridge, which had been endowed by Harold Harmsworth. He married Margaret De Gaudrion, born 21 December 1857, died 2 July 1916, in 1882. A Trinity Tutor from 1889 to 1899; he was tutor to Aleister Crowley.

His wife Margaret Verrall, a lecturer in classics at Newnham College, gained more fame through her psychic researches — an interest Arthur shared — and as a medium. She was a member of a Cambridge group who were early explorers of Spiritualism and automatic writing. Their daughter Helen married William Henry Salter, who was later President of the Society for Psychical Research (1947–48).  Mother and daughter were among mediums involved in the Palm Sunday Case, in which messages from the deceased Mary Catherine Lyttleton (who died on 21 March 1875) were supposedly transmitted by automatic writing to her lover Arthur Balfour.

He is buried at the Parish of the Ascension Burial Ground in Cambridge, with his wife and daughter Phoebe Margaret De Gaudrion Verrall (1888-1890); his wife was a member of the Ladies Dining Society, of which there were 11 (later 12) members. A portrait of Verrall by Frederic Yates is in the collection of Trinity College, Cambridge. He was an uncle of Joan Riviere, psychoanalyst et member of the British Psychoanalytic Society.

References

External links

 
 
 
Vita of Mrs. A. W. Verrall

British classical scholars
1851 births
1912 deaths
Parapsychologists
Burials in Cambridgeshire
People educated at Twyford School
Alumni of Trinity College, Cambridge
Fellows of Trinity College, Cambridge
People educated at Wellington College, Berkshire
Classical scholars of the University of Cambridge
Scholars of ancient Greek literature
King Edward VII Professors of English Literature